Ramón Masó Vallmajó (born 27 October 1987 in Olot, Girona, Catalonia) is a Spanish footballer who plays for Unió Esportiva Tona as a midfielder.

Honours
Barcelona
La Liga: 2005–06

External links

1987 births
Living people
People from Olot
Sportspeople from the Province of Girona
Spanish footballers
Footballers from Catalonia
Association football midfielders
La Liga players
Segunda División B players
Tercera División players
Divisiones Regionales de Fútbol players
FC Barcelona C players
FC Barcelona Atlètic players
FC Barcelona players
Girona FC players
UE Sant Andreu footballers
FC Santboià players
UE Olot players
AEC Manlleu footballers
UE Figueres footballers